The Woodman is a public house on Albert Street in Birmingham, England that is Grade II listed. It stands beside the Eastside City Park and the abandoned, but listed, Curzon Street railway station which will be part of the new station being developed as a terminal of the HS2 rail scheme.

History
The building was built in 1896 and 1897 with the purpose of being a public house for the Ansells Brewery. It was one of the small corner pubs designed by James & Lister Lea. The building is built from red brick and terracotta with a slate roof. Both the ground and first floor have narrow windows above the entrance, but with wide windows with brick mullions. Since its construction the pub has featured a large amount of tiling inside and large mirrors that are both gilded and engraved. There is still a "Smoke Room", although its original use is now prohibited by law, which again has the original Mintons tiling and seating. In August 2022 the pub announced its closure.

References

External links 

 

Pubs in Birmingham, West Midlands
Grade II listed buildings in Birmingham